Klekotiv is a village (selo) in Zolochiv Raion, Lviv Oblast, in western Ukraine. It belongs to Brody urban hromada, one of the hromadas of Ukraine. Klekotiv has a population of 314. 

From 1918 to 1939, the village, formerly known as Klekotów, was in Tarnopol Voivodeship in Poland.

Until 18 July 2020, Klekotiv belonged to Brody Raion. The raion was abolished in July 2020 as part of the administrative reform of Ukraine, which reduced the number of raions of Lviv Oblast to seven. The area of Brody Raion was merged into Zolochiv Raion.

Notable residents
 Leo Kanner, a Jewish-American psychiatrist who wrote works in the 1940s relating to autism

References

External links
gska2.rada.gov.ua

Villages in Zolochiv Raion, Lviv Oblast